Süßmann is a German surname meaning "sweet man" and has several variations due to transliteration obstacles.  It is also one of the Jewish surnames.

Variations of the surname 

Süssmann is the surname of:

 Michael Sussmann (b. 1964), American attorney
 Wilhelm Süssmann (or Wilhelm Süssman) (1891–1941), general in the Battle of Crete

Sussman is the surname of:

 Barry Sussman (b. 1934), city news editor at The Washington Post at the time of the Watergate break-in
 Brian Sussman (b. 1956), American conservative talk radio 
 Eve Sussman, British-American artist
 Gerald Jay Sussman (b. 1947), computer scientist
 Harvey M. Sussman, American linguist
 Joel Sussman (b. 1943), Israeli crystallographer
 Joseph M. Sussman (1939–2018), American professor
 Kevin Sussman (b. 1970), American actor
 Mike Sussman (b. 1967), TV series writer and producer
 Paul Sussman (1966–2012), English author, archaeologist and journalist
 Louis Sussmann-Hellborn (1828–1908), German sculptor, painter, art collector and contractor
 Rosalyn Sussman Yalow (1921–2011), American medical physicist, and a co-winner of the 1977 Nobel Prize in Physiology or Medicine
 Soren Hunter Miles Sussman Thompson (b. 1981), American world champion and Olympic fencer

Susman is the surname of:

 Andrew Susman (b. 1968), American communications executive, co-founder and former CEO of Studio One Networks
 Ellen Susman (b. 1950), American journalist, philanthropist, and television producer
 John Susman, American writer of plays and films
 Karen Hantze Susman (b. 1942), retired American tennis player
 Margarete Susman (1872–1966), German-Jewish poet, writer, and critic
 Stephen Susman (1941–2020), American plaintiffs attorney and a founding partner of Susman Godfrey
 Tina Susman, American journalist and editor and formerly missing person
 Todd Susman (b. 1947), American actor
 William Susman (b. 1960), American composer

Suzman is the surname of:

 Helen Suzman (1917–2009), South African anti-apartheid activist and politician
 James Suzman, South African anthropologist
 Janet Suzman (b. 1939), British-South African actress and director, and niece of Helen Suzman

Film 

 Susman, 1987 Hindi film directed by Shyam Benegal

See also 

 

German-language surnames
Jewish surnames